Aaron Paul Koch (born February 21, 1978, in Portland, Oregon) is a former National Football League offensive lineman for the Jacksonville Jaguars from 2000 to 2001.  He played college football at Oregon State University and was initially signed as an undrafted free agent after the 2000 NFL Draft by the Tennessee Titans. After being assigned to the Titan practice squad, he was then signed by the Jaguars later that season. He played in 24 games over two seasons.

External links
Database Football - Aaron Koch stats
NFL bio

1978 births
Living people
American football offensive guards
American football offensive tackles
Oregon State Beavers football players
Jacksonville Jaguars players
Players of American football from Portland, Oregon